Michael Bryan Stuart is an American attorney who served as the United States Attorney for the Southern District of West Virginia from 2018 to 2021. He was sworn in on January 9, 2018. Prior to assuming his current role, he was a lawyer for the law firm of Steptoe & Johnson. In 2014, Stuart chaired the West Virginia Presidential Debate Commission. From 2010 to 2012, he served as chairman of the West Virginia Republican Party. Stuart chaired Trump's 2016 presidential campaign in the state. Prior to his confirmation as a U.S. Attorney, Stuart said addressing the opioid epidemic would be a priority of his office. On February 8, 2021, he along with 55 other Trump-era attorneys were asked to resign. On February 12, he announced his resignation, effective February 28.

References

External links
 Biography at U.S. Department of Justice

1967 births
Living people
Boston University School of Law alumni
People from Philippi, West Virginia
State political party chairs of West Virginia
United States Attorneys for the Southern District of West Virginia
West Virginia lawyers
Republican Party West Virginia state senators
West Virginia University alumni
20th-century American lawyers
21st-century American lawyers